Canon law